Bohlulabad or Bahlulabad may refer to:
 Bohlulabad, Chaharmahal and Bakhtiari
 Bohlulabad, Razavi Khorasan
 Bohlulabad, Poldasht, West Azerbaijan Province
 Bahlulabad, Urmia, West Azerbaijan Province